The Evergreen Cooperatives are a connected group of worker-owned cooperatives in Cleveland, Ohio, USA. They are committed to local, worker-owned job creation; sustainable, green and democratic workplaces; and community economic development.

Overview

Background 
Much of the idea of worker control came about from the work of Hough Area Development Cooperation and the Congress of Racial Equality's Target City Project in Cleveland, Ohio. Beginning in 1967, both organizations created worker cooperatives and community owned businesses for residents in the area. Similar circumstances arose in places like Youngstown, Ohio, in  1977, when the Youngstown Sheet and Tube company abruptly closed and laid off 5,000 workers. In an effort to stop the layoffs, the workers and city attempted to buy a steel mill and control it themselves. Although the effort failed, it gave rise to the idea of worker self-management.

The Evergreen initiative was created in 2008 by the Cleveland Foundation, the City of Cleveland government, The  Democracy Collaborative at the University of Maryland, College Park, and the Ohio Employee Ownership Center at Kent State University, in collaboration with some of Cleveland's most important "anchor institutions", such as Case Western Reserve University, the Cleveland Clinic and University Hospitals. In November 2010, Evergreen Cooperatives consisted of the Evergreen Cooperative Laundry, Ohio Cooperative Solar, Green City Growers Cooperative and the Neighborhood Voice.

Worker-owned co-operatives 
Evergreen is one of a number of systems of worker-owned co-operatives pioneering an alternative model of business in the United States, based on the highly successful Mondragon Corporation in the Basque Region of Spain. These systems emphasize the network aspect of the Mondragon system — a connected group of semi-autonomous businesses, each owned and controlled by its workers but part of a mutually supportive, worker-owned and worker-controlled association — as opposed to the smaller, more fragmented worker co-ops that have existed in the U.S. for many years.

Evergreen Cooperative Laundry 
Evergreen Cooperative Laundry (ECL) is an industrial laundry serving local hospitals, hotels and other institutions. The ECL was funded with $5.8 million: $1.5 million from the Department of Housing and Urban Development and the City of Cleveland, $1.8 million in New Markets tax credits, $750,000 from the Cleveland Foundation, and $1.5 million from two banks. It operates at the capacity of 10 million pounds of sheets and towels per year, which represents 4% of the local market. According to some sources, the laundry has the potential to expend to 20 million pounds per year. Its customers include two large nursing homes in the local area — Judson Retirement and McGregor Homes. The laundry's LEED certified building uses the latest energy efficient equipment:
 It saves 35% of energy by warming up the clean water with heat from the used water.
 It eliminates hazardous waste by using EPA-approved chemicals.

The laundry hired 50 employees with the prospect for 35 more workers by the end of the year. Employees received on-the-job technical training and worked with Towards Employment, a workforce readiness organization which focuses on assisting groups which have typically had difficulty transitioning to gainful employment (e.g., people coming off welfare or out of jail).

Employees are paid $8 an hour for the first six months, while they are on a trial period. After that, they are considered for the membership in the co-operative by the peers’ voting. If they are admitted, the salary grows to $10.50 an hour, with 50 cents collected towards the ownership share. After seven years working in the laundry, the individual's share will be equal to $65,000.

Ohio Cooperative Solar 
Ohio Cooperative Solar (OCS), a partner member of the Evergreen Cooperatives, employs area residents to help local institutions become green using solar power and weatherizing techniques to improve their energy efficiency. OCS owns and installs photovoltaic solar panels on Cleveland-area institutional, governmental and commercial buildings and performs weatherizing projects for the area's low-income housing in the solar off-season. OCS is entirely worker-owned by citizens who "face barriers to employment". OCS was launched in October 2009 and was profitable within its first five months in business. By April 2010, OCS had fourteen employees.

OCS’ customer list includes large Cleveland institutions such as Cleveland Clinic, University Hospitals, Case Western Reserve University, City of Cleveland and the Cleveland Housing Network. In some instances, the client purchases the solar panels from OCS and hires the company to install them. Under this scenario, the client is then responsible for the maintenance of the system and arranging credits with the local utility, insurance and taxes. Alternatively, OCS will own the solar system, be responsible for all the arrangements, and sell the electricity at a negotiated rate to the client. This is the arrangement OCS has with the majority of its clients; it is expected that the project will create approximately 20 new full-time machinery operator and installer jobs to economically disadvantaged neighborhoods in the near future.

Legislation (Senate Bill 221) passed into Ohio state law mandates that utilities provide at least 25% of their electricity from alternative energy sources, including at least one-half percent from solar energy, by the year 2025.  According to the OCS chief executive officer, Steve Kiel, this means that Ohio must produce 60 megawatts of solar generating capacity in the year 2012. The state's current annual production is two megawatts.

To help Ohio meet this legislative mandate, OCS’ technical director Erika Weliczko announced that the company will be breaking new ground by "targeting several megawatts over the next couple of years…(T)hat’s on the order of nothing that’s been done in Ohio to date." In the next three years, OCS plans to have 50 to 100 employee-owners at work installing and maintain the solar panels necessary to meet the new state mandate.

When not working on solar panels, OCS employees work in the year-round weatherization program focused on households throughout Cleveland. According to Casey Gillfeather, OCS director of operations, the weatherization process includes insulating exterior walls, wrapping the hot water tank, installing an energy-efficient dryer vent, weatherize the basement, and insulating the attic in order to reduce energy consumption of the house by one-third.

Green City Growers Cooperative

Green City Growers Cooperative (GCGC) was conceived in 2008 as an entirely worker-owned, year-round, hydroponic food production greenhouse that could supply Cleveland-area retailers and wholesalers with fresh produce. The project is in the development stage, with financing and design details currently being determined. The dream looms large in the mind of Alayne Reitman, who came up with the original idea for the GCGC and is now the chief executive officer of the project: "We’re talking about a 5.5 acre greenhouse that will produce about 5-6 million heads of lettuce annually and another 300,000 pounds of herbs annually." Even in the poorest neighborhoods of Cleveland, people spend about $1,000 each on food per year.  The hope of the Growers Cooperative is to capture some of that expenditure by providing healthy, local options.

By 2010 the team implementing the project had begun an initial inquiry into what crops potential customers would like produced, developed a business plan that proposed the hiring of more than 40 employee owners, identified "green" energy sources and applied for and received an HUD grant and loan package that would allow the remediation of the brownfield site and development of the future facility. By 2010 they had received $10 million in federal loans and grants to date. At that stage, the Growers Cooperative intended finalize its designs and consolidate ten acres of land to house their new facilities, which would include the  greenhouse, a packing building, offices and advanced energy facilities. It was projected that the GCGC greenhouse would"almost certainly become the largest urban food-producing greenhouse in the country".

By 2012 the Green City Growers’ greenhouse was opened. A quicker growth cycle has been achieved by hydroponics, i. e. floating the produce on shallow pools of nutrient-enriched water. By carefully controlling the environment and using grow lights in winter, a consistent crop is maintained throughout the twelve-month cycle.

Neighborhood Voice
The Greater University Circle Neighborhood Voice is a free, student-owned and student-run newspaper and online news source covering worker co-op activity in Cleveland and other issues of concern to residents of the Buckeye-Shaker, Central, East Cleveland, Fairfax, Glenville, Hough, Little Italy, and University Circle neighborhoods.

References

External links 
 Evergreen Cooperatives official website
 The Democracy Collaborative
 Description of the Greater University Circle Initiative at the Cleveland Foundation's website
 Neighborhood Voice magazine
 Ted Howard's talk at TEDxCLE 2011

Cooperatives in the United States
Organizations based in Cleveland